The staurogram (⳨), also monogrammatic cross or tau-rho, is a ligature composed of a superposition of the Greek letters  tau (Τ)  and rho (Ρ).

Early occurrence and significance
The symbol is of pre-Christian origin. It is found on copper coins minted by Herod I in 37 BC, interpreted as a tr ligature representing trikhalkon indicating the coin value.

Abbreviation for stauros

Monogram of Christ
The Tau-Rho as a Christian symbol outside its function as nomen sacrum in biblical manuscripts appears from c. the 4th century, used as a monogramma Christi alongside the Chi-Rho and other variants, spreading to Western Europe in the 5th and 6th centuries.

In combination with alpha and omega
Ephrem the Syrian  (4th century) discusses a Christian symbol, apparently combining the Tau-Rho with Alpha and Omega placed under the left and right horizontal arms of the Tau.
Ephrem says that the Tau represents the cross of Jesus (prefigured by the outstretched hands of Moses in ), the Alpha and Omega signify that the crucified Christ is "the beginning and end", and the Rho, finally, signifies "Help", because of the
numerological value of the Greek word being 100, represented by Rho as a Greek numeral.

Tau and rho separately
The two letters tau and rho can be found separately (not in ligature) as symbols already on early Christian ossuaries.
The rho by itself can refer to Christ as Messiah because Abraham, taken as symbol of the Messiah, generated Isaac according to a promise made by God when he was one hundred years old, and 100 is the value of rho.

Coptic Unicode block

See also
 Chi (letter)
 Christogram
 Descriptions in antiquity of the execution cross
 Early Christian symbols
 Greek ligatures
 Stauros
 Stigma (letter)
 Tau cross

References

External links 
 
 

Greek ligatures
Christian crosses
Monograms